The 2003–04 season saw Leeds United relegated from the Premier League (known as the Barclaycard Premiership for sponsorship reasons) after 14 consecutive seasons in the top flight, in the wake of the club's financial crisis. Founding members of the Premier League in 1992, relegation saw them consigned to the First Division for the first time since 1990, this coming just three years after the club had reached the Champions League semi-finals in 2001.

Season summary

Having narrowly avoided relegation the previous campaign, another season of struggle was on the cards, as the financial crisis at Elland Road saw Leeds United's debts reach the £100 million mark, and consequently the sale of key players continued. Manager Peter Reid was sacked on 10 November after Leeds collected 8 points from their first 12 games, and former player, coach and manager Eddie Gray was brought in on a temporary basis. Some initially improved results saw Leeds climb out of the relegation zone by the end of 2003, but a dreadful run of seven straight defeats after the turn of the year saw them cast adrift at the bottom of the table, and from that point onwards the club had no real hope of surviving in the Premier League.

Some decent results late in the season saw them at least move off the bottom of the table, but a 4–1 defeat at Bolton on 2 May confirmed relegation, and Gray was soon on his way out of the club for good, to be replaced by Kevin Blackwell, who had been brought to the club a year earlier as Reid's assistant. Few observers gave Leeds much hope of an immediate promotion back to the Premiership, with Blackwell's ultimate task being seen as one of avoiding a second successive relegation.

Final league table

Kit
Leeds United retained the previous season's home kit, manufactured by Nike, although the kit carried a new sponsor, Whyte and Mackay. This marked the end of their previous three-year deal with Strongbow.

Players

First-team squad
Squad at end of season

Left club during season

Reserve squad

Youth team

Trialists

Statistics

Appearances and goals

|-
! colspan=14 style=background:#dcdcdc; text-align:center| Goalkeepers

|-
! colspan=14 style=background:#dcdcdc; text-align:center| Defenders

|-
! colspan=14 style=background:#dcdcdc; text-align:center| Midfielders

|-
! colspan=14 style=background:#dcdcdc; text-align:center| Forwards

|-
! colspan=14 style=background:#dcdcdc; text-align:center| Players transferred out during the season

Transfers

In

Out

Loaned in

Loaned out

Results

Premier League

Results by round

FA Cup

League Cup

References

Leeds United
Leeds United F.C. seasons
Foot